The Capital Region is a region in southwestern Iceland that comprises the national capital Reykjavík and six municipalities around it. Each municipality has its own elected council. Municipal governments in the region cooperate extensively in various fields: for example waste policy, shared public transport and a joint fire brigade. The region is home to 64% of Iceland's population.

The region contains Iceland's largest urban area by far, Greater Reykjavík, a conurbation that includes parts of six out of seven municipalities of the region (Kjósarhreppur is all rural).

Municipalities
Seven municipalities make up the Capital Region with Reykjavík being the most populated by far with 135,688 inhabitants. Kjósarhreppur is the largest municipality by area but is entirely rural and only has 244 inhabitants.

Urban areas
Statistics Iceland has defined contiguous urban areas which ignore municipal boundaries. An urban area may straddle multiple municipalities and a single municipality may contain more than one urban area.

References

External links

 
Geography of Reykjavík
Reykjavík